The Battle of Short Hills (also known as the Battle of Metuchen Meetinghouse and other names) was a conflict between a Continental Army force commanded by Brigadier General William Alexander ("Lord Stirling"), and an opposing British force commanded by Lieutenant General William Howe.  The battle took place on June 26, 1777, at Scotch Plains and Edison, New Jersey, during the American Revolutionary War. 

Despite the name, no fighting occurred in modern-day Short Hills, a section of Millburn.

In mid-June General Howe marched most of his army into central New Jersey in an attempt to lure George Washington's Continental Army to a place where it might be better attacked than its defensive position in the Watchung Mountains.  When Washington refused to abandon his position Howe returned to Amboy on June 22.  Washington's forward divisions, including that of Lord Stirling, shadowed this British movement, and Washington moved his main army out of the hills.  Howe seized this opportunity, and on June 26 marched two columns of troops out in an attempt to cut Washington off from the high ground.  These troops skirmished with Lord Stirling's troops, and eventually engaged in a pitched battle in Scotch Plains.  Stirling's outnumbered force retreated, but Washington, alerted to the British movement, had by then retreated back into the hills.

Background

In March 1776 the British forces of Lieutenant General William Howe withdrew from Boston after Major General George Washington fortified high ground threatening the city and its harbor.  With this army augmented by reinforcements from Europe, General Howe captured New York City, forcing Washington to retreat all the way across New Jersey.  At the end of 1776, Washington crossed the Delaware River and defeated Hessian forces at the Battle of Trenton on December 26, 1776, and eventually regained control of most of New Jersey.  The two armies then settled into winter quarters, and engaged in a war of skirmishes during the winter months of early 1777.

General Howe spent the winter planning a campaign to capture the seat of the rebel Congress, Philadelphia.  The constant skirmishing throughout the winter had taken its toll on his troops stationed in New Jersey, and even a major attack on the Continental Army outpost at Bound Brook in April had not been entirely successful.  Howe apparently did not divulge his plans or his intended route to Philadelphia to many people, and General Washington did not know what his intentions were, although Philadelphia was one target he suspected Howe was interested in.  On May 29, Washington moved most of his army from its winter quarters near Morristown to a strong position at Middlebrook in the Watchung Mountains from which he could observe and interfere with British moves toward Philadelphia.

Historians who mention this battle only occasionally give it a name.  It is often called "Short Hills", even though the battle took place primarily in present-day Edison and Scotch Plains, New Jersey.  Historians also give the battle other names; David Martin calls it "Flat Hills" or "Metuchen Meeting House"; one British regimental history refers to it by "Westfield".

Prelude
On June 9, Howe began moving troops from Staten Island to Perth Amboy.  On June 11, almost his entire army moved up the roads along the Raritan River to New Brunswick.  Washington's intelligence reports indicated that Howe had left behind equipment needed for crossing the Delaware River and was unlikely to be heading for Philadelphia; Washington, as a precautionary measure, called out the militia in southern New Jersey.  On June 14, Howe's army marched again, its destination Somerset Court House (present-day Millstone).  Apparently seeking to draw Washington into battle on open terrain, Howe remained there five days.  Washington refused to move out of the hills, and on June 19, Howe began the march back to Perth Amboy, which he reached on June 22, having completely evacuated New Brunswick.

After refusing to fall for Howe's trap, Washington followed the retreating British, bringing his army down from Middlebrook to Quibbletown, and sent a strong forward detachment under Brigadier General William Alexander (aka "Lord Stirling") to the Scotch Plains area north of New Brunswick, to cover his left flank and to harass the British.  Stirling's command, numbering about 2,500, comprised William Maxwell's New Jersey brigade, Thomas Conway's Pennsylvania brigade, Daniel Morgan's Corps of Riflemen and Ottendorf's Corps.  Maxwell's brigade consisted of the 1st through 4th New Jersey Continentals and Oliver Spencer's Additional Regiment, while Conway's consisted of the 3rd, 6th, 9th, and 12th Pennsylvania Continentals.  Ottendorf's Corps, although it was named for its principal recruiter, a German mercenary named Nicholas Dietrich, Baron de Ottendorf, was commanded by Charles Armand, a French soldier of fortune who was given its command in May 1777 after Ottendorf abruptly left the army.

Howe took advantage of Washington's movement, and launched a sudden attack against Lord Stirling's position, meant to devastate Stirling's forces, cut off Washington's retreat back to Middlebrook, and engage the Americans in a pitched battle on relatively open terrain.  At 1:00 am on the morning on June 26 Howe marched two columns of troops out of Perth Amboy.  The first column, under the command of Lieutenant General Charles Cornwallis, consisted of several companies of Hessian jägers, three battalions of Hessian grenadiers and one British, mounted Hessian chasseurs and some British dragoons from the 16th Light Dragoons, a battalion from the Brigade of Guards, and the Loyalist provincial unit of Queen's Rangers.  The second column was under the command of Major General John Vaughan and accompanied by General Howe.  It consisted of jäger companies from Hesse-Kassel and Ansbach-Bayreuth, and battalions of British light infantry and grenadiers.

The battle

The column of General Cornwallis marched for Woodbridge, while Vaughan's marched toward Bonhamton.  As the two columns moved on roughly parallel paths through the Short Hills area, they came into contact with Stirling's guards, and a running skirmish began, with the Americans firing on the British from the underbrush as they fell back.  The retreating Americans led both of the armies into the Ash Swamp and Scotch Plains areas, where Stirling prepared a defensive position.  Severe cannon fire and strength of British numbers forced Stirling, as determined as he was to stand against them, to retreat even further back, toward Westfield. There the British, suffering under the extreme heat of the day, ended the pursuit, and Stirling was able to fall back in good order toward the post at Middlebrook. A messenger had alerted Washington to Howe's proximity, prompting Washington to precipitately withdraw to a more secure position further in the hills. Later in the day, Howe arrived to inspect Washington's lines and adjudged them too strong to attack.  Because Stirling's resistance may have provided Washington with enough time to manage his withdrawal to more secure ground, the battle is considered a strategic victory for the Americans.  The British, after spending the night at Westfield, returned to their post at Perth Amboy, and completely evacuated New Jersey by June 30.  In mid-July, Howe embarked much of his army on transports, and sailed off toward Philadelphia, destination unknown to Washington.

A local tale arose in Westfield about an encounter between General Cornwallis and "Aunt Betty" Frazee, a local resident who had been baking bread for the Americans.  When Cornwallis arrived, he requested a loaf of bread from her.  When she offered it to him, saying "I give this not in love but in fear", Cornwallis graciously declined the offer, responding "Not a man of my command shall touch a single loaf."

Casualties

A British officer recorded the British and Hessian casualties as 5 killed and 30 wounded. The only officer casualty was Captain The Honourable John Finch of the Guards Light Infantry. He had been to the forefront of the attack and, at one point, called out to Lord Stirling, "Come here, you damned rebel, and I will do for you!" Stirling's response was to instruct four marksmen to concentrate their fire upon the captain. Finch soon received a wound, from which he died three days later.

The American casualties are not fully known; the British claimed the Americans suffered 100 killed and wounded, and both sides acknowledged the American loss of three cannons, and the capture of 70 men. Ottendorf's Corps, who had formed Stirling's advance guard appear to have been hardest hit: out of 80 men, 32 were killed or captured.  Colonel Israel Shreve, commander of the 2nd New Jersey Regiment wrote on July 6, 1777 that Maxwell's Brigade "had 12 killed and about 20 wounded and as many taken prisoners ... "; he also noted in his journal, "We had between 20 & 30 Wounded ... mostly slightly Except 3 or 4 ..." Two officers are recorded as having been lost in the 2nd New Jersey: Captain Ephraim Anderson, killed, and Captain James Lawrie, captured.

Legacy
The area includes portions of the municipal land, as well as a part of the Plainfield Country Club. Edison's Oak Tree Pond Park is used as a reenactment site of the battle.

Notes

References

 2003 Da Capo reprint, .

Further reading

1777 in the United States
Conflicts in 1777
Short Hills, Battle of
Short Hills, Battle of
Short Hills, Battle of
Short Hills, Battle of
Short Hills, Battle of
Union County, New Jersey
1777 in New Jersey
Conflict sites on the National Register of Historic Places in New Jersey
American Revolution on the National Register of Historic Places
Short Hills